Neuroligin-2 is a protein that in humans is encoded by the NLGN2 gene.

This gene encodes a member of a family of neuronal cell surface proteins. Members of this family may act as splice site-specific ligands for beta-neurexins and may be involved in the formation and remodeling of central nervous system synapses.

References

Further reading